Joseph Petrowski is the founder and managing partner of Mercantor Partners, an investment firm and management team working with Arclight Capital of Boston to undertake investments in downstream energy and retail convenience stores. Petrowski is a member of the board of South Jersey Industries (NYSE ticker symbol: SJI), a publicly traded natural gas utility and national energy merchant. Petrowski also serves as a board member for the Society of Independent Gasoline Marketers, Claremont McKenna College, Boston College High School, Trinity Catholic and on the advisory council of the Boston Federal Reserve. He graduated cum laude from Harvard College in 1976.

Prior to forming Mercantor Partners, Petrowski served as chief executive officer and a member of the board of directors for Gulf Oil L.P. and Cumberland Farms, Inc. from 2005 through 2013. During his time as CEO, the company achieved record earnings and increased the Cumberland Farms retail store count to 700 and Gulf branded locations to 3,500. When Petrowski left The Cumberland Gulf Group, the company was ranked by Forbes magazine as the 13th largest privately held company in the United States with $15 billion in annual revenue and over 7,000 employees.

In 2016, Petrowski joined Yesway (previously BW Gas & Convenience Stores LLC) as a Senior Advisor to Chairman and Chief Executive Officer.

References

Living people
Harvard College alumni
20th-century American businesspeople
American retail chief executives
American company founders
21st-century American businesspeople
People from Wellesley, Massachusetts
Gulf Oil
Year of birth missing (living people)